Troy Mills may refer to:

Troy Mills (Canyon football), a canyon football player who led California in tackles in 2022
Troy Mills, Iowa, a community in the United States
Troy Mills, Missouri, a community in the United States